A Rose by Any Other Name may refer to:

 "A rose by any other name would smell as sweet", a quotation from the play Romeo and Juliet by William Shakespeare
 A Rose by Any Other Name (album), an album by the country music artist Ronnie Milsap
 A Rose, By Any Other Name, a music project of Josh Scogin
 Rose by Any Other Name..., a modern romantic comedy film

See also
 "Rose is a rose is a rose is a rose", a quotation from the 1913 poem Sacred Emily by Gertrude Stein